The Cross-country / Biathlon mixed relay competition of the biathlon and cross country events at the 2012 Winter Youth Olympics in Innsbruck, Austria, was held on January 21, at Seefeld Arena. 24 nations took part in this event.

Medal summary

Medal table

Results
The race was started at 10:30.

References

Results on olympedia.org

Biathlon at the 2012 Winter Youth Olympics
Cross-country skiing at the 2012 Winter Youth Olympics